Saratoga may refer to:

Places

Australia
Saratoga, New South Wales, coastal suburb of Central Coast Council

United States

New York 
Saratoga County, New York
Saratoga, New York, town
Saratoga Springs, New York, city (commonly referred to simply as "Saratoga")
Saratoga Performing Arts Center
Saratoga Race Course, thoroughbred horse racing track

Other
Saratoga, California, city in Santa Clara County
 Saratoga, former name of Yeomet, California
Saratoga, Indiana, town in Randolph County
Saratoga, Minnesota
Saratoga, Mississippi, unincorporated community
Saratoga, Nebraska Territory, boom and bust town now inside of Omaha, Nebraska
Saratoga, North Carolina, town in Wilson County
Saratoga, Texas, unincorporated community in Hardin County
Saratoga Springs, Utah, city in Utah County
Saratoga, Clarke County, Virginia, small unincorporated community
Saratoga (Boyce, Virginia), a home (the General Daniel Morgan House)
Saratoga, Wisconsin, town
Saratoga, Wyoming, town in Carbon County
Saratoga Passage, Puget Sound, Washington
Saratoga Township (disambiguation)

Battles
Saratoga campaign (1777), during the American Revolutionary War
Battles of Saratoga, climax of the campaign

Transportation
Saratoga, Mount McGregor and Lake George Railroad
Chrysler Saratoga, a model of automobile
Piper Saratoga (Piper PA-32R), a single engine light aircraft by manufacturer Piper Aircraft
USS Saratoga, any of several U.S. Navy ships named after the Battle of Saratoga

Film and music
 Saratoga (play), 1870 play by Bronson Howard
 Saratoga (film), 1937 film set in the New York race track area, starring Clark Gable and Jean Harlow
 Saratoga (musical), a musical play from 1959
 "Saratoga", a former name of the 1970s American rock and roll band Kansas (band)
 Saratoga (band), Spanish heavy metal band
 Saratoga, CA - 9.18.06, Official Bootleg live album of singer-songwriter Ani DiFranco

Other
Either of two species of Australian fish in the family Osteoglossidae:
Southern saratoga (also spotted saratoga)
Gulf saratoga
Saratoga (grape), another name for the Catawba grape
Saratoga Protocol, developed by Surrey Satellite Technology Ltd to efficiently transfer remote-sensing imagery from the low-Earth-orbiting satellite Disaster Monitoring Constellation